

Valneva SE is a French biotech company headquartered in Saint-Herblain, France, developing and commercializing vaccines for infectious diseases. It has manufacturing sites in Livingston, Scotland; Solna, Sweden, and Vienna, Austria, with other offices in France, Canada and the United States.


Background
Valneva was founded in 2013 through the merger of Austrian company Intercell and French company Vivalis SA. It has been listed since 28 May 2013 on the Euronext Paris in Paris and used to be listed on the Vienna Stock Exchange.

Products

Released Vaccines 
Vaccines marketed by Valneva include Ixiaro, a vaccine against Japanese encephalitis (approved in Europe, America and Australia) and Dukoral, a vaccine against cholera (approved in Europe and Australia).

Failed developments 
Some of its candidates have failed in clinical trials: VLA43, a therapeutic vaccine against Pseudomonas aeruginosa,  V710, a therapeutic vaccine against Staphylococcus aureus (in collaboration with Merck), and  IC41, therapeutic vaccine against hepatitis C.

COVID-19 vaccine 

Valneva along with Dynavax Technologies  developed a candidate inactivated whole virus vaccine against COVID-19, VLA2001 derived from its Ixiaro Japanese encephalitis vaccine, which is undergoing a Phase 1/2 trial in the United Kingdom. The Phase 1/2 trial has 150 participants testing three dose levels for safety, tolerability, and immunogenicity. The trial is expected to be complete by 15 February 2021, with full reporting completed by August 2021.

Valneva and dynavax  technologies  had reached an agreement with the UK government to provide up to 100 million doses to be manufactured at its facility in Livingston, Scotland. The UK government pre-ordered 60 million doses. The trials are being supported by the UK National Institute for Health Research and four British universities. Due to government support, Valneva would progress immediately into Phase 3 trials and develop production capacity before the full evaluation of the Phase 1/2 trial, rather than the traditional slower sequential approach which has lower financial risk.

The company manufacturing facility in Livingston, Scotland produces the VLA2001 vaccine.

In September 2021, Valneva announced that the UK government had cancelled their vaccine order. The cancellation reason was not officially given, but seems to be related to difficulties getting building materials due to Brexit and not vaccine quality.

On 14 April 2022, the UK Medicines and Healthcare products Regulatory Agency (MHRA) approved the vaccine, being the first in the world to do so.

On 17 May 2022 the European Commission cancelled its advance purchase agreement for the vaccine which would have seen Valneva provide 60 million doses over two years.

Other vaccines under development 
Valneva is also working on four other vaccines :

 Vaccine against chikungunya
 VLA15 : a vaccine against Lyme disease that is planned for release around 2024. 
 A vaccine against Clostridiodes difficile infection
 A vaccine against the Zika virus
On 20 June 2022, American Biotech firm Pfizer announced a 90.5 million euros ($95.24 million) investment, buying an 8.1% percent stake in Valneva as part of a partnership to tackle Lyme disease.

References

External links
 
 Vienna Stock Exchange: Market Data Valneva SE

Manufacturing companies based in Vienna
Biotechnology companies of France
Pharmaceutical companies established in 2013
Companies listed on Euronext Paris
COVID-19 vaccine producers